Oakdale is a historic home and farm located near the town of Floyd in Floyd County, Virginia, United States.  The house was built about 1890, and is a large two-story, three bay, frame dwelling in the Queen Anne style. It has a complex hipped roof and features a double-tier heavily ornamented front porch with turned posts, a spindle frieze, and sawn brackets. Also, on the property are a contributing large center-aisle barn (c. 1890), a two-story brick general store building (c. 1890), and a granary (c. 1915) and garage (c. 1935).

It was listed on the National Register of Historic Places in 2010.

References

Houses on the National Register of Historic Places in Virginia
Houses completed in 1890
Queen Anne architecture in Virginia
Houses in Floyd County, Virginia
National Register of Historic Places in Floyd County, Virginia